The light-front quantization
of quantum field theories
provides a useful alternative to ordinary equal-time 
quantization.  In
particular, it can lead to a relativistic description of bound systems
in terms of quantum-mechanical wave functions.  The quantization is
based on the choice of light-front coordinates,
where  plays the role of time and the corresponding spatial
Here,  is the ordinary time, 
is one Cartesian coordinate, 
The other
transverse or perpendicular, denoted by symbols of the type 
.  The choice of the 
frame of reference where the time
 and -axis are defined can be left unspecified in an exactly
soluble relativistic theory, but in practical calculations some choices may be more suitable than others.

Overview 

In practice, virtually all measurements are made at fixed light-front 
time. For example, when an electron scatters on a proton as in the 
famous SLAC experiments that discovered the quark structure of 
hadrons, the interaction with 
the constituents occurs at a single light-front time.
When one takes a flash photograph, the recorded image shows the object 
as the front of the light wave from the flash crosses the object.
Thus Dirac used the terminology "light-front"  and  "front form" in 
contrast to ordinary instant time and "instant form". 
Light waves traveling in the negative  direction

As emphasized by Dirac, Lorentz boosts
of states at fixed 
light-front time are simple kinematic transformations.
The description of physical systems in light-front coordinates is 
unchanged by light-front boosts to frames moving with respect to the
one specified initially.  This also means that there is a separation of
external and internal coordinates (just as in nonrelativistic
systems), and the internal wave functions are independent of the
external coordinates, if there is no external force or field.  In 
contrast, it is a difficult dynamical problem to calculate the effects 
of boosts of states defined at a fixed instant time .

The description of a bound state in a quantum field theory, such as an 
atom in quantum electrodynamics (QED) or a hadron in quantum chromodynamics (QCD),
generally requires multiple wave
functions,  because quantum field theories include processes which
create and annihilate particles.  The state of the system then does
not have a definite number of particles, but is instead a
quantum-mechanical linear combination of Fock states, each
with a definite particle number.  Any single measurement of particle
number will return a value with a probability determined by the
amplitude of the Fock state with that number of particles.  These
amplitudes are the light-front wave functions.  The light-front 
wave functions are each frame-independent and independent of the 
total momentum.

The wave functions are the solution of a field-theoretic analog of the
Schrödinger equation
 of nonrelativistic quantum
mechanics.  In the nonrelativistic theory the 
Hamiltonian operator
 is just a kinetic
piece  and 
a potential piece .
The wave function  is a function of the coordinate , and
 is the energy.  In light-front quantization, the formulation is
usually  written in terms of light-front momenta 
, with  a particle index,
, 
, and  the particle mass, and light-front
energies .  They satisfy the
mass-shell
condition 

The analog of the nonrelativistic Hamiltonian  is the light-front 
operator , which generates 
translations in light-front time.
It is constructed from the Lagrangian for the chosen quantum field
theory.  The total light-front momentum of the system,
, is the sum of the 
single-particle light-front momenta.  The total light-front energy
 is fixed by the mass-shell condition to be
, where  is the invariant mass of the system.
The Schrödinger-like equation of light-front quantization is then
.  This provides a
foundation for a nonperturbative analysis of quantum field theories
that is quite distinct from the lattice
approach.

Quantization on the light-front provides the rigorous
field-theoretical realization of the intuitive ideas of the 
parton model
which is formulated at fixed  in the 
infinite-momentum frame.

(see #Infinite momentum frame) 
The same results are obtained in the front
form for any frame; e.g., the  structure functions and other
probabilistic parton distributions measured in deep inelastic scattering
are obtained from the squares of the boost-invariant light-front wave 
functions,
the eigensolution of the light-front
Hamiltonian.  The Bjorken kinematic variable  of deep
inelastic scattering becomes identified with the light-front fraction at small
. The Balitsky–Fadin–Kuraev–Lipatov 
(BFKL)
Regge behavior of structure functions can be
demonstrated from the behavior of light-front wave functions at small .  
The Dokshitzer–Gribov–Lipatov–Altarelli–Parisi (DGLAP) 
evolution
of structure functions and the
Efremov–Radyushkin–Brodsky–Lepage (ERBL) 
evolution

of distribution amplitudes  
transverse momentum.

Computing hadronic matrix elements of currents is particularly simple
on the light-front, since they can be obtained rigorously as overlaps
of light-front wave functions as in the Drell–Yan–West
formula.

The gauge-invariant meson and baryon distribution amplitudes which control hard exclusive and direct reactions are the valence light-front wave functions integrated over transverse momentum at fixed . The "ERBL"
evolution of distribution amplitudes and the factorization theorems for hard exclusive processes can be derived most easily using light-front methods.  Given the frame-independent light-front wave functions, one can compute a large range of hadronic observables including generalized parton distributions, Wigner distributions, etc.  For example, the "handbag" contribution to the generalized parton distributions for deeply virtual Compton scattering, which can be computed from the overlap of light-front wave functions, automatically satisfies the known sum rules.

The light-front wave functions contain information about novel features of QCD.
These include effects suggested from other
approaches, such as color transparency, 
hidden color, intrinsic charm, 
sea-quark symmetries, dijet diffraction, direct hard processes, and
hadronic spin dynamics.

One can also prove fundamental theorems for relativistic quantum 
field theories using the front form, including: 
(a) the cluster decomposition theorem
and (b) the vanishing 
of the anomalous gravitomagnetic moment for any Fock state of a 
hadron;
one also can show that a nonzero 
anomalous magnetic moment of a bound state requires nonzero 
angular momentum of the constituents.  The cluster 
properties
of light-front time-ordered perturbation theory, 
together with  conservation, can be used 
to elegantly derive the Parke–Taylor rules for multi-gluon scattering 
amplitudes.
The counting-rule
behavior of structure functions 
at large  and Bloom–Gilman 
duality

have also been derived in light-front QCD (LFQCD). 
The existence of "lensing effects"  at leading twist, such as the
-odd "Sivers effect" in spin-dependent semi-inclusive deep-inelastic 
scattering, was first demonstrated using light-front 
methods.

Light-front quantization is thus the natural framework for the
description of the nonperturbative relativistic bound-state structure
of hadrons in quantum chromodynamics.  The formalism is rigorous,
relativistic, and frame-independent.  However, there exist subtle
problems in LFQCD that require thorough investigation. For example,
the complexities of the vacuum in the usual instant-time formulation,
such as the Higgs mechanism and 
condensates in  theory, have
their counterparts in zero modes or, possibly, in additional terms in
the LFQCD Hamiltonian that are allowed by power
counting.
Light-front considerations of the vacuum as well as
the problem of achieving full covariance in LFQCD require close
attention to the light-front singularities and zero-mode
contributions.

The truncation of the light-front
Fock-space calls for the introduction of effective quark and gluon
degrees of freedom to overcome truncation effects.  Introduction of
such effective degrees of freedom is what one desires in seeking the
dynamical connection between canonical (or current) quarks and
effective (or constituent) quarks that Melosh sought, and Gell-Mann
advocated, as a method for truncating QCD.

The light-front Hamiltonian formulation thus opens access to QCD at the
amplitude level and is poised to become the foundation for a common
treatment of spectroscopy and the parton structure of hadrons in a
single covariant formalism, providing a unifying connection between
low-energy and high-energy experimental data that so far remain
largely disconnected.

Fundamentals

Front-form relativistic quantum mechanics was introduced by Paul Dirac
in a 1949 paper published in Reviews of Modern Physics.
Light-front quantum field theory is the front-form representation of 
local relativistic quantum field theory.

The relativistic invariance of a quantum theory means that the
observables (probabilities, expectation values
and ensemble averages) have the same values in all inertial coordinate systems.  Since
different inertial coordinate systems are related by inhomogeneous
Lorentz transformations (Poincaré transformations), this requires
that the Poincaré group is a symmetry group of the theory.
Wigner
and Bargmann
showed that this symmetry must be realized by a unitary representation of the
connected component of the Poincaré group on the Hilbert space of
the quantum theory.  The Poincaré symmetry is a dynamical symmetry
because Poincaré transformations mix both space and time variables.
The dynamical nature of this symmetry is most easily seen by noting
that the Hamiltonian appears on the right-hand side of three of the
commutators of the Poincaré generators, 
, where  are 
components of the linear momentum and
 are components of rotation-less boost generators.  If the
Hamiltonian includes interactions, i.e. , then the
commutation relations cannot be satisfied unless at least three of the
Poincaré generators also include interactions.
 
Dirac's paper introduced three distinct ways to minimally
include interactions in the Poincaré Lie algebra.  He referred to
the different minimal choices as the "instant-form", "point-form"
and "front-from" of the dynamics.  Each "form of dynamics" is
characterized by a different interaction-free (kinematic) subgroup of
the Poincaré group.  In Dirac's instant-form dynamics the kinematic
subgroup is the three-dimensional Euclidean subgroup generated by 
spatial translations and rotations, in Dirac's point-form dynamics 
the kinematic subgroup is the Lorentz group and in Dirac's 
"light-front dynamics" the kinematic subgroup
is the group of transformations that leave a three-dimensional
hyperplane tangent to the light cone invariant.

A light front is a three-dimensional hyperplane defined by the condition:

.
Coordinates of points on the light-front hyperplane are

The Lorentz invariant inner product of two
can be expressed in terms of their light-front components as

In a front-form relativistic quantum theory the three interacting
generators of the Poincaré group are 
, 
the generator of translations normal to the light front, and 
, 
the generators of rotations
transverse to the light-front.   is called the "light-front"
Hamiltonian.

The kinematic generators, which generate transformations tangent to
the light front, are free of interaction.
which generate translations tangent to the light front,
 which generates rotations
about the  axis, and the generators
light-front preserving boosts,

which form a closed subalgebra.

Light-front quantum theories have the following distinguishing properties:

 Only three Poincaré generators include interactions.  All of Dirac's other forms of the dynamics require four or more interacting generators.
 The light-front boosts are a three-parameter subgroup of the Lorentz group that leave the light front invariant.
 The spectrum of the kinematic generator, is the positive real line.

These properties have consequences that are useful in applications.

There is no loss of generality in using light-front relativistic
quantum theories.  For systems of a finite number of degrees of
freedom there are explicit -matrix-preserving unitary
transformations that transform theories with light-front kinematic
subgroups to equivalent theories with instant-form or point-form
kinematic subgroups.  One expects that this is true in quantum field
theory, although establishing the equivalence requires a
nonperturbative definition of the theories in different forms of
dynamics.

Light-front boosts 

In general if one multiplies a Lorentz boost on the right by a
momentum-dependent rotation, which leaves the rest vector unchanged, the
result is a different type of boost.  In principle there are as many
different kinds of boosts as there are momentum-dependent rotations.
The most common choices are rotation-less boosts, 
helicity boosts, and
light-front boosts.  The light-front boost 
is a Lorentz boost that leaves the light front invariant.

The light-front boosts are not only members of the light-front
kinematic subgroup, but they also form a closed three-parameter
subgroup.  This has two consequences.  First, because the boosts do
not involve interactions, the unitary representations of light-front
boosts of an interacting system of particles are tensor products of
single-particle representations of light-front boosts.  Second,
because these boosts form a subgroup, arbitrary sequences of
light-front boosts that return to the starting frame 
do not generate Wigner rotations.

The spin of a particle in a relativistic quantum theory is the angular
momentum of the particle in its rest frame.  Spin observables are
defined by boosting the particle's angular momentum tensor to the
particle's rest frame

where  is a Lorentz boost that

The components of the resulting spin vector, always
satisfy  commutation relations, but the individual components will
depend on the choice of boost .  
The light-front components of the spin are obtained by choosing
 to be the inverse of the light-front 
preserving boost,.

The light-front components of the spin are the components of the spin
measured in the particle's rest frame after transforming the particle
to its rest frame with the light-front preserving boost.
The light-front spin is invariant with respect to light-front
preserving-boosts because these boosts do not generate Wigner
rotations.  The component of this spin along the 
direction is called the light-front helicity.  In addition to being
invariant, it is also a kinematic observable, i.e. free of
interactions.  It is called a helicity because the spin quantization
axis is determined by the orientation of the light front.  It differs
from the Jacob–Wick helicity, where the quantization axis is
determined by the direction of the momentum.

These properties simplify the computation of current matrix elements
because (1) initial and final states in different frames are related
by kinematic Lorentz transformations, (2) the one-body contributions
to the current matrix, which are important for hard scattering, do not
mix with the interaction-dependent parts of the current under light
front boosts and (3) the light-front helicities remain invariant with
respect to the light-front boosts.  Thus, light-front helicity is 
conserved by every interaction at every vertex.

Because of these properties, front-form quantum theory is the only
form of relativistic dynamics that has true "frame-independent"
impulse approximations, in the sense that one-body current operators
remain one-body operators in all frames related by light-front boosts
and the momentum transferred to the system is identical to the
momentum transferred to the constituent particles.  Dynamical
constraints, which follow from rotational covariance and current
covariance, relate matrix elements with different magnetic quantum numbers.
This means that consistent impulse approximations can only
be applied to linearly independent current matrix elements.

Spectral condition 

A second unique feature of light-front quantum theory follows because
the operator  is non-negative and kinematic.  The kinematic
feature means that the generator  is the sum of the non-negative
single-particle  generators, (.  It follows
that if  is zero on a state, then each of the individual 
must also vanish on the state.

In perturbative light-front quantum field theory this property leads
to a suppression of a large class of diagrams, including all vacuum
diagrams, which have zero internal . The condition 
corresponds to infinite momentum .  Many of the
simplifications of light-front quantum field theory are realized in
the infinite momentum 
limit

of ordinary canonical field theory (see #Infinite momentum frame).

subsequent suppression of the vacuum diagrams in perturbative field
theory is that the perturbative vacuum is the same as the free-field
vacuum.  This results in one of the great simplifications of
light-front quantum field theory, but it also leads to some puzzles
with regard the formulation of theories with 
spontaneously broken symmetries.

Equivalence of forms of dynamics 

Sokolov

demonstrated that
relativistic quantum theories based on different forms of dynamics are
related by -matrix-preserving unitary transformations.  The
equivalence in field theories is more complicated because the
definition of the field theory requires a redefinition of the
ill-defined local operator products that appear in the dynamical
generators.  This is achieved through renormalization.  At the
perturbative level, the ultraviolet divergences of a canonical field
theory are replaced by a mixture of ultraviolet and infrared 
divergences in light-front field theory.  These have to be
renormalized in a manner that recovers the full rotational covariance and
maintains the -matrix equivalence.  The renormalization of light
front field theories is discussed in Light-front computational methods#Renormalization group.

Classical vs quantum 

One of the properties of the classical wave equation is that the
light-front is a characteristic surface for the initial value problem.
This means the data on the light front is insufficient to generate a
unique evolution off of the light front.  If one thinks in purely
classical terms one might anticipate that this problem could lead to
an ill-defined quantum theory upon quantization.

In the quantum case the problem is to find a set of ten self-adjoint
operators that satisfy the Poincaré Lie algebra.  In the absence of
interactions, Stone's theorem applied to tensor products of known
unitary irreducible representations of the Poincaré group gives a
set of self-adjoint light-front generators with all of the required
properties.  The problem of adding interactions is no
different
than it is in non-relativistic quantum
mechanics, except that the added interactions also need to preserve
the commutation relations.

There are, however, some related observations.  One is that if one
takes seriously the classical picture of evolution off of surfaces with
 are only invariant under a six parameter subgroup.  This means
that if one chooses a quantization surface with a fixed non-zero
interacting generator.  This does not happen in light-front quantum
mechanics; all seven kinematic generators remain kinematic.  The
reason is that the choice of light front is more closely related to 
the choice of kinematic subgroup, than the choice of an initial 
value surface.

In quantum field theory, the vacuum expectation value of two fields 
restricted to the light front are not well-defined distributions on
test functions restricted to the light front.  They only become
well defined distributions on functions of four space time 
variables.

Rotational invariance 

The dynamical nature of rotations in light-front quantum theory means
that preserving full rotational invariance is non-trivial. In field
theory, Noether's theorem provides explicit expressions for the
rotation generators, but truncations to a finite number of degrees of
freedom can lead to violations of rotational invariance.  The general
problem is how to construct dynamical rotation generators that satisfy
kinematic generators.  A related problem is that, given that the
choice of orientation of the light front manifestly breaks the
rotational symmetry of the theory, how is the rotational symmetry of
the theory recovered?

Given a dynamical unitary representation of rotations, the
product  of a kinematic rotation with the
inverse of the corresponding dynamical rotation is a unitary operator
that (1) preserves the -matrix and (2) changes the kinematic
subgroup to a kinematic subgroup with a rotated light front,
.  Conversely, if the -matrix
is invariant with respect to changing the orientation of the
light-front, then the dynamical unitary representation of rotations,
, can be constructed using the generalized wave operators for
different orientations of the light 
front

and the kinematic representation of rotations

of the -matrix with respect to changing the orientation of the
light front implies the existence of a consistent dynamical rotation
generator without the need to explicitly construct that generator.
The success or failure of this approach is related to ensuring the
correct rotational properties of the asymptotic states used to
construct the wave operators, which in turn requires that the

These observations make it clear that the rotational covariance of the
theory is encoded in the choice of light-front Hamiltonian.  
Karmanov

introduced a
covariant formulation of light-front quantum theory, where the
orientation of the light front is treated as a degree of freedom.
This formalism can be used to identify observables that do not depend
on the orientation, of the light front (see
#Covariant formulation).

While the light-front components of the spin are invariant under
light-front boosts, they Wigner rotate under rotation-less boosts and
ordinary rotations.  Under rotations the light-front components of the
single-particle spins of different particles experience different
Wigner rotations.  This means that the light-front spin components
cannot be directly coupled using the standard rules of angular
momentum addition.  Instead, they must first be transformed to the
more standard canonical spin components, which have the property that
the Wigner rotation of a rotation is the rotation.  The spins can then
be added using the standard rules of angular momentum addition and the
resulting composite canonical spin components can be transformed back
to the light-front composite spin components.  The transformations
between the different types of spin components are called Melosh
rotations.

They are the momentum-dependent
rotations constructed by multiplying a light-front boost 
followed by the inverse
of the corresponding rotation-less boost.  In order to also add the
relative orbital angular momenta, the relative orbital
angular momenta of each particle must also be converted to a
representation where they Wigner rotate with the spins.
   
While the problem of adding spins and internal orbital angular momenta
is more complicated,
it is only total angular
momentum that requires interactions; the total spin does not
necessarily require an interaction dependence.  Where the interaction
dependence explicitly appears is in the relation between the total spin
and the total angular 
momentum

where here  and  contain interactions.  The transverse
components of the 
light-front spin,  may or may not have an
interaction dependence; however, if one also demands cluster
properties,
then the transverse components of
total spin necessarily have an interaction dependence.  The result is
that by choosing the light front components of the spin to be
kinematic it is possible to realize full rotational invariance at the
expense of cluster properties.  Alternatively it is easy to realize
cluster properties at the expense of full rotational symmetry.  For
models of a finite number of degrees of freedom there are
constructions that realize both full rotational covariance and cluster
properties;
these realizations all have additional
many-body interactions in the generators that are functions of
fewer-body interactions.

The dynamical nature of the rotation generators means that 
tensor and spinor operators, whose commutation relations with the 
rotation generators are linear in the components of these 
operators,  impose dynamical constraints that relate different
components of these operators.

Nonperturbative dynamics 

The strategy for performing nonperturbative calculations in
light-front field theory is similar to the strategy used in lattice
calculations.  In both cases a nonperturbative regularization and
renormalization are used to try to construct effective theories of a
finite number of degrees of freedom that are insensitive to the
eliminated degrees of freedom.  In both cases the success of the
renormalization program requires that the theory has a fixed point of
the renormalization group; however, the details of the two approaches
differ.  The renormalization methods used in light-front field theory
are discussed in Light-front computational methods#Renormalization group.  
In the lattice case the
computation of observables in the effective theory involves the
evaluation of large-dimensional integrals, while in the case of
light-front field theory solutions of the effective theory involve
solving large systems of linear equations.  In both cases
multi-dimensional integrals and linear systems are sufficiently well
understood to formally estimate numerical errors. In practice such
calculations can only be performed for the simplest systems.
Light-front calculations have the special advantage that the
calculations are all in Minkowski space and the results are wave
functions and scattering amplitudes.

Relativistic quantum mechanics 

While most applications of light-front quantum mechanics are to the
light-front formulation of quantum field theory, it is also possible
to formulate relativistic quantum mechanics of finite systems of
directly interacting particles with a light-front kinematic subgroup.
Light-front relativistic quantum mechanics is formulated on the direct
sum of tensor products of single-particle Hilbert spaces.  The
kinematic representation  of the Poincaré group on
this space is the direct sum of tensor products of the single-particle
unitary irreducible representations of the Poincaré group.  A
front-form dynamics on this space is defined by a dynamical
representation of the Poincaré group  on this space
where  when  is in the kinematic subgroup of the
Poincare group.

One of the advantages of light-front quantum mechanics is that it is
possible to realize exact rotational covariance for system of a finite
number of degrees of freedom.  The way that this is done is to start
with the non-interacting generators of the full Poincaré group, 
which are sums of single-particle generators, construct the kinematic invariant
mass operator, the three kinematic generators of translations tangent
to the light-front, the three kinematic light-front boost generators
and the three components of the light-front spin operator.
The generators are well-defined functions of these
operators

given by 
Interactions
that commute with all of these operators except the kinematic mass are
added to the kinematic mass operator to construct a dynamical mass
operator.
for  gives a set of dynamical Poincare generators with a
light-front kinematic subgroup.

A complete set of irreducible eigenstates can be found by
diagonalizing the interacting mass operator in a basis of simultaneous
eigenstates of the light-front components of the kinematic momenta,
the kinematic mass, the kinematic spin and the projection of the
kinematic spin on the  axis.  This is equivalent to
solving the center-of-mass Schrödinger equation in non-relativistic
quantum mechanics.  The resulting mass eigenstates transform
irreducibly under the action of the Poincare group.  These
irreducible representations define the dynamical representation of the
Poincare group on the Hilbert space.

This representation fails to satisfy cluster
properties, but this can be restored using a
front-form generalization
 of the
recursive construction given by Sokolov.

Infinite momentum frame 

The infinite momentum frame (IMF) was originally 
introduced
 to provide a physical interpretation
of the Bjorken variable  measured in deep
inelastic lepton-proton scattering  in
Feynman's parton model.  (Here  is the square of the
spacelike momentum transfer imparted by the lepton and 
 is the energy transferred in the proton's rest
frame.)  If one considers a hypothetical Lorentz frame where the
observer is moving at infinite momentum, in the
negative  direction, then  can be interpreted as the
longitudinal momentum fraction  carried by the
struck quark (or "parton") in the incoming fast moving proton.  The
structure function of the proton measured in the experiment is then
given by the square of its instant-form wave function boosted to
infinite momentum.

Formally, there is a simple connection between the Hamiltonian
formulation of quantum field theories quantized at fixed time  (the
"instant form" ) where the observer is moving at infinite momentum
and light-front Hamiltonian theory quantized at fixed light-front time
 (the "front form").  A typical energy denominator in
the instant-form is 
 
where  
is the sum of energies of the particles in the
intermediate state.  In the IMF, where the observer moves at high
momentum  in the negative  direction, the leading terms in
 cancel, and the energy denominator becomes  where
 is invariant mass squared of the initial state.  Thus, by
energy denominator which appears in light-front Hamiltonian theory.
This correspondence has a physical meaning: measurements made by an
observer moving at infinite momentum is analogous to making
observations approaching the speed of light—thus matching to the
front form where measurements are made along the front of a
light wave. An example of an application to quantum electrodynamics
can be found in the work of Brodsky, Roskies and 
Suaya.

The vacuum state in the instant form defined at fixed  is acausal
and infinitely complicated. For example, in quantum electrodynamics,
bubble graphs of all orders, starting with the 
intermediate state, appear in the ground state vacuum; however, as
shown by Weinberg, such vacuum graphs are
Thus, one can again match the
instant form to the front-form formulation where such vacuum loop
diagrams do not appear in the QED ground state. This is because the
 momentum of each constituent is positive, but must sum to zero in
the vacuum state since the momenta are conserved.  However, unlike
the instant form, no dynamical boosts are required, and the front form
formulation is causal and frame-independent.  The infinite momentum
frame formalism is useful as an intuitive tool; however, the limit
 is not a rigorous limit, and the need to boost the
instant-form wave function introduces complexities.

Covariant formulation 

In light-front coordinates,
do not enter symmetrically: the coordinate  is distinguished, 
whereas  and  do not appear at all. This non-covariant 
definition destroys the spatial symmetry that, in its turn, 
results in a few difficulties related to the fact that some 
transformation of the reference frame may change the orientation 
of the light-front plane. That is, the transformations of the reference frame
and variation of orientation of the light-front plane are not decoupled from 
each other. Since the wave function depends dynamically on the
orientation of the plane where it is defined,  under these transformations 
the light-front wave function is transformed by  dynamical  operators (depending 
on the interaction). Therefore, in general, one should know the interaction to go from 
given reference frame to the new one. The loss of symmetry between 
the coordinates  and  
complicates also the construction of the states with definite angular 
momentum  since the latter is just a property of the wave function 
relative to the rotations which affects all the coordinates .

To overcome this inconvenience, there was developed the explicitly 
covariant version
 of
light-front quantization (reviewed by Carbonell 
et al.), 
in which the state vector is defined on the light-front plane of 
general orientation:
 (instead of ), 
where 
 is a four-dimensional vector in the four-dimensional space-time and 
 is also a four-dimensional vector with the property . In the particular case  
we come back to the standard construction. In the explicitly covariant formulation the 
transformation of the reference frame and the change of orientation of the light-front plane 
are decoupled. All the rotations and the Lorentz transformations are purely 
kinematical (they do not require knowledge of the interaction), whereas the 
(dynamical) dependence on the orientation of the light-front plane is covariantly parametrized 
by the wave function dependence on the four-vector .

There were formulated the rules of graph techniques which, for a given Lagrangian, 
allow to calculate the perturbative decomposition of the state vector evolving in the 
light-front time  (in contrast to the evolution in the 
direction  or ). For the instant form of dynamics, 
these rules were first developed by 
Kadyshevsky.

By these rules, the light-front amplitudes are represented as the
integrals over the momenta of particles in  intermediate states. These 
integrals are three-dimensional, and all the four-momenta  
are on the corresponding mass shells ,
in contrast to the Feynman rules containing four-dimensional integrals over the off-mass-shell momenta. However, the calculated light-front amplitudes, being on the mass shell, are in general the off-energy-shell amplitudes. This means that the on-mass-shell four-momenta, 
which these amplitudes depend on, are not conserved in the direction   
(or, in general, in the direction ).
The off-energy shell amplitudes do not coincide with the Feynman amplitudes, and they depend on
the orientation of the light-front plane. In the covariant formulation, this dependence is explicit: 
This allows one to apply to them in 
full measure the well known techniques developed for the covariant  [[Feynman 
amplitudes]] (constructing the invariant variables, similar to the Mandelstam variables, 
on which the amplitudes depend;  
the decompositions, in the case of particles with spins, in invariant amplitudes; 
extracting electromagnetic form factors; etc.). The irreducible off-energy-shell 
amplitudes serve as the kernels of equations for the light-front wave functions.
The latter ones are found from these equations and used to analyze hadrons 
and nuclei.

the amplitudes found by the rules of covariant graph techniques, after replacement of variables, are reduced to the amplitudes given by the Weinberg 
rules in the 
infinite momentum frame.  The dependence on orientation of the 
light-front plane manifests itself in the dependence of the off-energy-shell Weinberg 
amplitudes on the variables  taken separately but not 
in some particular combinations like the Mandelstam variables .

On the energy shell, the amplitudes do not depend 
on the four-vector  determining orientation of the corresponding 
light-front plane. These on-energy-shell amplitudes coincide with the on-mass-shell 
amplitudes given 
by the Feynman rules. However, the dependence on  can survive 
because of approximations.

Angular momentum 

The covariant formulation is especially useful for constructing the states with 
definite angular momentum.
In this construction, the four-vector  participates on equal footing 
with other four-momenta, and, therefore, the main part of this problem is reduced to the well known one. 
For example, as is well known, the wave function of a non-relativistic system, 
consisting of two spinless particles with the relative momentum  
and with total angular momentum , is proportional to the spherical 
function : , 
modulus . 
The angular momentum operator reads: .
Then the wave function of a relativistic system in the covariant formulation of 
light-front dynamics obtains the similar form:

where 
The variables ,  are invariant not only under rotations 
of the vectors ,  but also under rotations and the Lorentz 
transformations of initial four-vectors , .
The second contribution 

means that the operator of the total angular momentum in explicitly covariant  
light-front dynamics obtains an additional 
term: . 
For non-zero spin particles this operator obtains the contribution of the spin 
operators:

 
The fact that the transformations changing the orientation of the light-front 
plane are dynamical (the corresponding generators of the Poincare group contain 
interaction) manifests itself in the dependence 
of the coefficients  on the scalar product  varying 
when the orientation of the unit vector  changes (for fixed ). 
This dependence (together with the dependence on ) is found from the dynamical 
equation for the wave function.

A peculiarity of this construction is in the fact 
that there exists the operator  which commutes both 
Then the states are labeled also 
by the eigenvalue  of the operator : . 
For given angular momentum , there are  such the states. All of them are 
degenerate, i.e. belong to the same mass (if we do not make an approximation). 
However, the wave function should also satisfy the so-called angular 
condition

After satisfying it, the solution obtains the form of a unique superposition of 
the states  with different eigenvalues 
.

The extra contribution  in the light-front angular 
momentum operator increases the number of spin components 
in the light-front wave function. For example, the non-relativistic deuteron wave function 
is determined by two components (- and -waves).
Whereas, the relativistic light-front  deuteron wave function is determined by six 
components.
These components were calculated in the one-boson exchange 
model.

Goals and prospects 

The central issue for light-front quantization
is the rigorous description of hadrons, nuclei, and systems
thereof from first principles in QCD. The main
goals of the research using light-front dynamics are

 Evaluation of masses and wave functions of hadrons using the light-front Hamiltonian of QCD.
 The analysis of hadronic and nuclear phenomenology based on fundamental quark and gluon dynamics, taking advantage of the connections between quark-gluon and nuclear many-body methods.
 Understanding of the properties of QCD at finite temperatures and densities, which is relevant for understanding the early universe as well as compact stellar objects.
 Developing predictions for tests at the new and upgraded hadron experimental facilities -- JLAB, LHC, RHIC, J-PARC, GSI(FAIR).
 Analyzing the physics of intense laser fields, including a nonperturbative approach to strong-field QED.
 Providing bottom-up fitness tests for model theories as exemplified in the case of Standard Model.

The nonperturbative analysis of light-front QCD requires the following:

 Continue testing the light-front Hamiltonian approach in simple theories in order to improve our understanding of its peculiarities and treacherous points vis a vis manifestly-covariant quantization methods.
This will include work on theories such as Yukawa
theory and QED and on theories with
unbroken supersymmetry, in order to understand the
strengths and limitations of different methods.
Much progress has already been made along these
lines.

 Construct symmetry-preserving regularization and renormalization schemes for light-front QCD, to include the Pauli–Villars-based method of the St. Petersburg group, Glazek-Wilson similarity renormalization-group procedure for Hamiltonians, Mathiot-Grange test functions, Karmanov-Mathiot-Smirnov realization of sector-dependent renormalization, and determine how to incorporate symmetry breaking in light-front quantization; this is likely to require an analysis of zero modes and in-hadron condensates.

 Develop computer codes which implement the regularization and renormalization schemes.
Provide a platform-independent, well-documented
core of routines that allow investigators to
implement different numerical approximations to
field-theoretic eigenvalue problems, including the
light-front coupled-cluster
method<ref name="LFCC}. Consider various
quadrature schemes and basis sets, including
Discretized Light-Cone Quantization
(DLCQ),
 
finite elements, function
expansions, 
and the complete orthonormal wave functions obtained from
AdS/QCD. This will build on
the Lanczos-based MPI code developed for
nonrelativistic nuclear physics applications and
similar codes for Yukawa theory and
lower-dimensional supersymmetric Yang—Mills
theories.

 Address the problem of computing rigorous bounds on truncation errors, particularly for energy scales where QCD is strongly coupled.
Understand the role of renormalization group methods, asymptotic
errors.

 Solve for hadronic masses and wave functions. 
Use these wave
functions to compute form factors, generalized parton distributions,
scattering amplitudes, and decay rates. Compare
with perturbation theory, lattice QCD, and model
calculations, using insights from AdS/QCD, where
possible. Study the transition to nuclear degrees
of freedom, beginning with light nuclei.

 Classify the spectrum with respect to total angular momentum. 
In equal-time quantization, the three generators of rotations 
are kinematic, and the analysis of total angular momentum is 
relatively simple. In light-front quantization,
only the generator of rotations around the -axis is
kinematic; the other two, of rotations about axes
To solve the angular
momentum classification problem, the eigenstates
and spectra of the sum of squares of these
generators must be constructed. This is the price to pay for having more 
kinematical generators than in equal-time quantization, 
where all three boosts are dynamical. In light-front
quantization, the boost along  is kinematic,
and this greatly simplifies the calculation of
matrix elements that involve boosts, such as the
ones needed to calculate form factors. The
relation to covariant Bethe–Salpeter approaches
projected on the light-front may help in
understanding the angular momentum issue and its
relationship to the Fock-space truncation of the
light-front Hamiltonian. Model-independent constraints from
the general angular condition,
which must be satisfied by the light-front helicity
amplitudes, should also be explored. The
contribution from the zero mode appears necessary
for the hadron form factors to satisfy angular
momentum conservation, as expressed by the angular
condition. 
The relation to light-front quantum mechanics, where it is possible
to exactly realize full rotational covariance and construct explicit
representations of the dynamical rotation generators, should also be
investigated.

 Explore the AdS/QCD correspondence and light front holography.
The approximate duality in the limit of massless
quarks motivates few-body analyses of meson and
baryon spectra based on a one-dimensional
light-front Schrödinger equation in terms of the
modified transverse coordinate . Models
that extend the approach to massive quarks have
been proposed, but a more fundamental
understanding within QCD is needed. The nonzero
quark masses introduce a non-trivial dependence on
the longitudinal momentum, and thereby highlight
the need to understand the representation of
rotational symmetry within the formalism.
Exploring AdS/QCD wave functions as part of a
physically motivated Fock-space basis set to
diagonalize the LFQCD Hamiltonian should shed
light on both issues. The complementary Ehrenfest
interpretation
can be used to introduce effective
degrees of freedom such as diquarks in
baryons.

 Develop numerical methods/computer codes to directly evaluate the partition function (viz. thermodynamic potential) as the basic thermodynamic quantity. 
Compare to lattice QCD,
where applicable, and focus on a finite chemical
potential, where reliable lattice QCD results are
presently available only at very small (net) quark
densities. There is also an opportunity for use of
light-front AdS/QCD to explore non-equilibrium phenomena
such as transport properties during the very early
state of a heavy ion collision. Light-front AdS/QCD opens
the possibility to investigate hadron formation in
such a non-equilibrated strongly coupled
quark-gluon plasma.

 Develop a light-front approach to the neutrino oscillation experiments possible at Fermilab and elsewhere, with the goal of reducing the energy spread of the neutrino-generating hadronic sources, so that the three-energy-slits interference picture of the oscillation pattern can be resolved and the front form of Hamiltonian dynamics utilized in providing the foundation for qualitatively new (treating the vacuum differently) studies of neutrino mass generation mechanisms.

 If the renormalization group procedure for effective particles (RGPEP) does allow one to study intrinsic charm, bottom, and glue in a systematically renormalized and convergent light-front Fock-space expansion, one might consider a host of new experimental studies of production processes using the intrinsic components that are not included in the calculations based on gluon and quark splitting functions.

See also 
Light-front computational methods
Light-front quantization applications
Quantum field theories
Quantum chromodynamics
Quantum electrodynamics
Light-front holography

References

External links 
ILCAC, Inc., the International Light-Cone Advisory Committee.
Publications on light-front dynamics, maintained by A. Harindranath.

Quantum chromodynamics
Theoretical physics